Niphargus timavi is a species of crustacean in family Niphargidae. It is found in Italy and Slovenia.

References

External links
 Niphargus Website - University of Ljubljana

Niphargidae
Crustaceans described in 1954
Taxonomy articles created by Polbot